St. James' Episcopal Church is a parish of the Episcopal Church in South Pasadena, California, and part of the Episcopal Diocese of Los Angeles.

The church's mission is "To Learn, to Love, to Live the Word of God."

History 

The church began informally in 1890 as St. Andrews Mission, with support from All Saints Episcopal Church in nearby Pasadena. In 1905, a temporary structure was built on the corner of Monterey Road and Fremont Avenue, where the current church would be later built.

Building 

The historic church was designed by chief architect Bertram Goodhue of Cram, Goodhue and Ferguson in a mix of Gothic Revival and Romanesque Revival architectural styles. The church is #33 on South Pasadena's list of historic landmarks. The stained glass windows were made by Judson Studios.

In 1919, a $3,000 addition was started, which included a stage and dressing rooms. The chimes were donated to the building by aviator Pancho Barnes, who, on January 5, 1921, had married Rev. C. Rankin Barnes at the church.

The tower was damaged in the 1987 Whittier Narrows earthquake. When the tower was repaired and retrofitted to meet earthquake protection standards, the chapel's pillars were narrowed, which had been obstructing views of the front of the church from rear pews.

Notable events 
The church was the site of the 1929 wedding of actress Bessie Love to William Hawks, attended by such celebrities as Ronald Colman and William Powell, mobbed by a crowd of 25,000, and documented in Cecil Beaton's Diaries.

References

External links 
 
 St. James' Episcopal School
 St. James' Parish Day School
 
 
 St. James' Episcopal Church at The Episcopal Church

Buildings and structures in Los Angeles County, California
Churches in Los Angeles County, California
Los Angeles Historic-Cultural Monuments
South Pasadena, California
20th-century Episcopal church buildings
Churches completed in 1907
Episcopal church buildings in California